Korkor may refer to:

Places
Korkor, Borujerd
Korkor, Selseleh
 Qorqor, a village in Isfahan Province, Iran

Other
Korkor (boat), a small rowing or sailing fishing canoe from the Marshall Islands

See also
Qarqar (Karkar) (disambiguation)
Gargar (disambiguation)